Edward Leon Budde (born November 2, 1940) is an American former professional football player who was an offensive guard for the Kansas City Chiefs in the American Football League (AFL) and the National Football League (NFL).

High school and college
A product of Denby High School in Detroit, Michigan, and later Michigan State University, Budde was chosen as the number one draft pick of the American Football League's Kansas City Chiefs in 1963.

Kansas City Chiefs
Budde played for the Kansas City Chiefs for 14 years as the left offensive guard, longer than any other Chief except for punter Jerrel Wilson, by one year. From 1963 to 1971, he did not miss a single start, playing in all 14 games. Budde was 6'5 and 260 pounds (118 kg) with an unusual stance, in that he put his left hand down instead of the usual right. His explosive blocks often sprung a running back loose or kept defenders away from Chiefs quarterback Len Dawson. At the heart of the Chiefs’ offensive line with Jim Tyrer at left offensive tackle, his overpowering presence helped the Chiefs win two American Football League Championships (1966 and 1969) and a world championship in Super Bowl IV after defeating the NFL's Minnesota Vikings 23-7, with Budde able to handle the opposing right defensive tackle, Hall-of-Famer, Alan Page.

Budde was selected to the American Football League All-Star team in 1963, ‘66, ‘67, ‘68, and 1969, and played in six AFL All-Star games.  He was selected for the Sporting News AFL All-League team in 1969. Budde was the first offensive lineman to be selected by the Associated Press as an Offensive Player of the Week.

Budde, who retired after the 1976 season, is a member of the All-Time All-AFL Team First-team.

His son Brad Budde was an All-American at the University of Southern California and also played in the NFL for the Chiefs, the only father-son combo to be first round draft picks for the same NFL team.

See also
 List of American Football League players

References

 
 History: The AFL - Pro Football Hall of Fame link

External links
 

1940 births
Living people
American football offensive guards
Kansas City Chiefs players
Michigan State Spartans football players
American Conference Pro Bowl players
American Football League All-League players
American Football League All-Star players
American Football League All-Time Team
Denby High School alumni
People from Highland Park, Michigan
Players of American football from Detroit
American Football League players